Carlo Mascheroni (born 7 June 1940 in Giussano) is an Italian equestrian and sportsman who competes at the international level in horse-driving (single, pairs and four-in-hand).

Biography

Mascheroni was born in Giussano into a family of saddlers. Since 1898, his grandfather Carlo and his father Ugo produced hand-crafted leather harnesses and goods.

Nine-time Italian champion in driving, Mascheroni represented Italy at the World Equestrian Games (WEG) 1994 in Den Haag, the Netherlands; in 1998 at Pratoni del Vivaro, Roma; in 2002 at Jerez de la Frontera, Spain and in 2006 in Aachen, Germany in four-in-hand driving. He won his first international driving competition in Rome at the 1982 CSIO Passo Corese.

Based in Giussano (near Milan), Italy, Mascheroni owns a saddlery and collects antique carriages, leather harnesses, harness goods and accessories.

Awards
Gold medals at the Italian Championship in driving pairs:
 1977 Parco di Monza
 1980 Crema (Crema)
 1986 Cislago (Varese)
 1992 Soiano  (Bergamo), Cigliano (BG) and Oreno di Vimercate
 2002 Oreno di Vimercate (Mi)
 2004 San Rossore (Pisa)
 2005 Pratoni del Vivaro (Rome)

Mascheroni began competing in combined driving in 1984, and has competed every year since with pairs and teams.
He has participated in every World Pairs Championship from 1985 to 2001, and in every World Teams Championships since 1994. In the Coupe Danube, he represented Italian driving for the rest of Europe.
Mascheroni uses a Kühnle Sport Phaeton carriage.

International results

 2006 CAI-A/B/CAIP- München-Riem ‘06 (Ger) 4 2 3 6 with horse team
 2006 CAI-A Altenfelden ‘06 (Aut) 12 9 13 13 with horse team
 2005 CAI-A/CAIP-A Weer ‘05 (Aut) 26 26 29 22 with horse pair
 2005 CAI-A Conty ‘05 (Fra) 11 19 8 7 with horse pair
 2004 CAI-A Nebanice ‘04 (Cze) - 6 - - with horse team
 2004 CAI-A Weer ‘04 (Aut) 2 1 2 3 with horse team
 2004 CAI-A Altenfelden ‘04 (Aut) 12 7 12 2 with horse team
 2003 CAI-B Oreno di Vimercate ‘03 (Ita) 7 4 3 14 with horse pair
 2003 CAI-A Weer ‘03 (Aut) 5 11 7 2 with horse pair
 2003 CAI-A Altenfelden ‘03 (Aut) 18 18 30 14 with horse pair
 2002 CAI-A Karlstetten ‘02 (Aut) - 43 EL 43 with horse pair
 2002 CAI-A Riesenbeck ‘02 (Ger) 25 25 26 22 with horse team
 2002 CAI-A/CAIP-A Weer ‘02 (Aut) 6 6 7 1 with horse team
 2002 CAI-A Altenfelden ‘02 (Aut) 9 9 AB 5 with horse team
 2001 CAI-A 1/2 Verona ’01 (Ita) 6 13 with horse pair
 2000 CAI-B Aosta '00 (Ita) 1 1 1 1 (only competitor)
 1999 CAI St. Gallen ‘99 (Sui) - AB with horse team
 1998 CAI Riesenbeck ‘98 (Ger) 30 with horse team
 1998 CAI Compiegne ‘98 (Fra) - with horse team
 2005 Wals-Siezenheim ‘05 (Aut) 52 67 39 30
 2004 Kecskemét ‘04 (Hun) - 39 - 47
 2002 Jerez de la Frontera ‘02 (Esp) - 43 39 EL with horse team
 2001 Riesenbeck '01 (Ger) 57 58 - 57-member Italian team (19th place)
 2000 Wolfsburg '00 (Ger) 48 50 47 with horse team
 1998 Rome ‘98 (Ita) 35 with horse team
 1996 Waregem ‘96 (Bel) 34 member Italian team (10th place)
 1994 The Hague ‘94 (Ned) EL

World Championship horse team:
 Hruszew 15 (Polish gelding)
 Lokator 12 (Polish gelding)
 Mayor 13 (gelding)
 Lisander 11 (NN gelding)
 Amigo 11 (GBR gelding)
 Freedom 10 Hanoverian stallion)

Bibliography

 Paolo Manili, Carlo Mascheroni: l'uomo dei cavalli e delle carrozze
 https://data.fei.org/Person/Performance.aspx?personfeiid=10000352
 https://twitter.com/myfei_home/status/502829030585147393/photo/1
 http://www.ilgiornale.it/milano/in_carrozza_corte_re_carlo/06-06-2010/articolo-id=450973-page=0-comments=1
 http://www.ilcittadinomb.it/stories/Cronaca/360555/
 https://web.archive.org/web/20150713223614/http://www.jumpingverona.it/it/mascheroni_si_prepara_con_il_suo_tiro_a_quattro
 https://data.fei.org/Person/Detail.aspx?p=BFA0214C6FC80631C8EEB7D3A83861AD
 http://www.commercio.regione.lombardia.it/cs/Satellite?c=Redazionale_P&childpagename=DG_Commercio%2FDetail&cid=1213761432709&%20packedargs=curImg%3D1%26locale%3D1194453881584&pagename=DG_COMMWrapper&numr=4
 http://www.regione.lombardia.it/cs/Satellite?c=News&cid=1213761288642&childpagename=Regione%2FDetail&pagename=RGNWrapper
 http://www.mbnews.it/2015/10/premio-negozi-storici-riconoscimenti-anche-a-4-realta-brianzole/
 
 http://www.ilgiorno.it/negozi-storici-lombardia-1.1405006
 http://www.cavallomagazine.it/moda-sport-e-equitazione-mascheroni-eccellenza-lombarda-doc-1.1413563

Historical Facts
The real grandfather Carlo Mascheroni at age of 19, was the first founder of the company Mascheroni, based in Giussano since 1898.

Ref: Camera di Commercio Milano dall’archivio Albo Artigiani di Milano Num: R.D 136206 Mascheroni Carlo Born in Giussano 26 July 1880 inscription of the company: 1927 April 10 
Name: Mascheroni Carlo, Saddlery manufacturing 
Great grand father Carlo Mascheroni born in Giussano  1880 July 26
Grand father Ugo Mascheroni born in Giussano 1912 August 20
Mr. Carlo Mascheroni born in Giussano 1940 June 6

Decreto of Regione Lombardia, Italy Mascheroni was graduated as Historica Heritage of excellence companies in Italy by: DECRETO N. 7405 Del 15/09/2015 Identificativo Atto n. 209 DIREZIONE GENERALE COMMERCIO, TURISMO E TERZIARIO RICONOSCIMENTO E VALORIZZAZIONE DEI LUOGHI STORICI DEL COMMERCIO IN LOMBARDIA IN ATTUAZIONE DELLA D.G.R. 20 GENNAIO 2009 N. VIII/8886.

 http://www.commercio.regione.lombardia.it/shared/ccurl/52/372/DECRETO%20N%207405%20del%2015%20set%202015_%20Negozi%20Storici%20alleg%20A%20e%20B.pdf

Horse driving
1940 births
Living people